Mangadu is a western neighborhood of Chennai, India. Literally meaning a mango forest, Mangadu Municipality is about 18 km from Chennai Central railway station, 14 km from Chennai International Airport and 13 km from CMBT.

Demographics
 India census, Mangadu had a population of 38188. Males constitute 49% of the population and females 51%. Mangadu has an average literacy rate of 86.91%, higher than the national average of 80.6%: male literacy is 91.77%, and female literacy is 82.05%. In Mangadu, 11% of the population is under 6 years of age.

Religion
Mangadu is famous for the majestic and famous Kamakshi Amman Temple, Mangadu. This temple group oversees the daily operations of approximate 7 temples in the locality.  The famous temples of Mangadu are -
 Velleswarar Temple, Mangadu
 Sri Vaikunta Perumal Temple, Mangadu
 Vinayagar Temple, Mangadu
 Mandhi amman Temple, Mangadu
 Solai Mandhi Amman Temple, Mangadu
 Thorpathi Amman Temple, Mangadu

Hospitals
 Government Primary Health Centre, Mangadu
 Muthukumaran Medical College Hospital

Chennai Metro Rail
The proposed Chennai Metro Phase 2 Corridor 4 links Poonamallee with Light House. The proposed Kumanamchavadi and Kattupakkam metro stations will be around 2 kilometres from Mangadu Bus Terminal.

Educational Institutions

Schools
Maharishi Vidya Mandir School CBSE
Velammal Vidyalaya CBSE
RISHS International School CBSE
Mangadu Public School CBSE
Padma Subramaniam Bala Bhavan Matriculation Higher Secondary School PSBB
Nav Bharat Matriculation Higher Secondary School
National IT International Matriculation Higher Secondary School
Government Higher Secondary School
Government Primary School
Sridevi Matric School, Mangadu
Government Primary School, Pattur Mangadu 
Government Muslim High School, Pattur
Government Adi Dravidar Welfare School
St. Marys Matriculation School
Little Flower Matriculation School
Atchaya School for Kids
Zee Kids School

Colleges
 Sri Muthukumaran Medical College
 Sri Muthukumaran Arts and Science College
 Sri Muthukumaran Institute of Technology
 Sri Muthukumaran College of Education
 Meenakshi College of Nursing
 Little Flower Polytechnic College

Nearby Areas
Centre    = Mangadu
North     = Poonamallee
Northeast = Kattupakkam
East      = Porur
Southeast = Gerugambakkam
South     = Kundrathur 
Southwest = Kovur
West      = Kozhumanivakkam
Northwest = Nazarathpet

References

Cities and towns in Kanchipuram district
Neighbourhoods in Chennai